Těšínsko, also known as Cieszyn Silesia, is a historical region in south-eastern Silesia.

Těšínsko may also refer to:
 Těšínsko (magazine), a Czech magazine
 38674 Těšínsko, asteroid